Polish Church may refer to:

Organizations
Catholic Church in Poland
Polish Lutheran Church
Polish National Catholic Church
Polish Orthodox Church

Buildings
 Steindamm Church, a former church in Königsberg
 Notre-Dame-de-l'Assomption, Paris, a Polish church in Paris
 Polish Catholic Mission, a mission operating several churches in the Polish diaspora

See also
Polish Catholic (disambiguation)
Polish Catholic Church (disambiguation)